Perschbacher is a surname. Notable people with the surname include:

Rex R. Perschbacher ( 1946–2018), American legal scholar
Wesley John Perschbacher (1932–2012), American writer and academic